{{Taxobox
| name = Oligella
| domain = Bacteria
| phylum = Pseudomonadota
| classis = Betaproteobacteria
| ordo = Burkholderiales
| familia = Alcaligenaceae
| genus = Oligella
| genus_authority = Rossau et al. 1987
| type_species = Oligella urethralis
| subdivision_ranks = Species
| subdivision =O. ureolyticaO. urethralis}}

Oligella is a genus of Gram-negative, aerobic bacteria from the family Alcaligenaceae.

The genus Oligella includes at least 2 species. Oligella ureolytica is more prominent than Oligella urethralis''.

Clinical 
Clinical infections due to these organisms are rare. The common causes are related to the GU tract and urinary tract obstruction.

References

Burkholderiales
Bacteria genera